Immelman is a surname. Notable people with the surname include:

 Henry Immelman (born 1994), South African rugby union footballer
 Mark Immelman (born 1970), South African sportscaster
 Nicolaas Immelman (born 1993), South African rugby union footballer
 Niel Immelman (born 1944), South African classical pianist
 Quinton Immelman (born 1981), South African rugby referee
 Trevor Immelman (born 1979), South African professional golfer

See also

 Hans Imelmann (1897–1917) WWI flying ace
 Immelmann (disambiguation)